The Styria S-Bahn, initially also known as "Graz S-Bahn", is a local transport project that connects the metropolitan area of Graz and the central region of Upper Styria of the Austrian state of Styria. This project has been working since 1998. Commissioning took place on 9 December 2007.

Completion is scheduled for 2026. In the future, the S-Bahn should provide better connections in 15- or 30-minute intervals as well as air-conditioned and low-floor trains. In 2017, for example, there is an hourly train every sunday between the airport and the city of Graz. The 30-minute clock is maintained by the regional bus service. The attractiveness of rail transport has significantly increased passenger numbers, which is in line with the goal of counteracting the increase in motorized private transport with public transport.

Lines

Future extension 
There are plans to extend the lines {S6 and S61 to Eibiswald and to electrify the routes of the S6, S7 and S61.
Due to the construction of the Koralmbahn, an underground line including a tunnel station at Graz Airport.

Notes

References

External links 

 

S-Bahn in Austria